The 1978–79 Macedonian Republic League was the 35th since its establishment. FK Pobeda won their 4th championship title.

Participating teams

Final table

External links
SportSport.ba
Football Federation of Macedonia 

Macedonian Football League seasons
Yugo
3